Courtney Jones (born 10 September 2000) is an Australian rules footballer playing for Richmond in the AFL Women's (AFLW). She has previously played for Carlton and the Gold Coast.

AFL Women's career
Jones began her AFLW career at Carlton and was traded to the Gold Coast Suns in June 2022.

In March 2023, Jones was traded to Richmond in a straight swap for Maddy Brancatisano. The reason for the trade was because Jones needed to return to Melbourne to be close to her younger sister who was diagnosed with thyroid cancer in January.

References

External links
 

2000 births
Living people
Gold Coast Football Club (AFLW) players